The following elections occurred in the year 1952.

 1952 Chilean presidential election
 1952 Dahomeyan Territorial Assembly election
 1952 Dutch general election
 1952 Gabonese legislative election
 1952 Greek legislative election
 1952 Icelandic presidential election
 1952 Japanese general election
 1952 Mexican general election
 1952 Panamanian general election
 1952 Polish legislative election
 1952 Salvadoran legislative election
 1952 Ubangi-Shari parliamentary election

Asia
 1952 Afghan parliamentary election
 1951–1952 Burmese general election
 1952 Ceylonese parliamentary election
 1952 Iranian legislative election
 1952 Israeli presidential election

India
 1952 Indian presidential election
 1951–52 elections in India

Legislative Assembly elections
 1952 Hyderabad Legislative Assembly election
 1952 Madras Legislative Assembly election
 1952 West Bengal Legislative Assembly election

Australia
 1952 Bradfield by-election
 1952 Lyne by-election
 1952 Werriwa by-election

Europe
 1952 Irish presidential election
 1952 Swedish general election

United Kingdom
 1952 Belfast South by-election
 1952 Bournemouth East and Christchurch by-election

North America

Canada
 1952 Alberta general election
 1952 British Columbia general election
 1952 Edmonton municipal election
 1952 New Brunswick general election
 1952 Ottawa municipal election
 1952 Quebec general election
 1952 Saskatchewan general election
 1952 Toronto municipal election
 1952 Yukon general election

Mexico
 1952 Mexican general election

United States
 1952 United States presidential election
 1952 Louisiana gubernatorial election
 1952 Maine gubernatorial election
 1952 Massachusetts gubernatorial election
 1952 Minnesota gubernatorial election
 1952 New York state election

United States House of Representatives
 1952 United States House of Representatives elections
 United States House of Representatives elections in California, 1952
 United States House of Representatives elections in South Carolina, 1952

United States Senate
 1952 United States Senate elections
 United States Senate election in Massachusetts, 1952
 United States Senate election in North Dakota, 1952

Oceania

Australia
 1952 Bradfield by-election
 1952 Lyne by-election
 1952 Werriwa by-election

South America

Falkland Islands
 1952 Falkland Islands general election

See also

 
1952
Elections